Otterbach is a former Verbandsgemeinde ("collective municipality") in the district of Kaiserslautern, Rhineland-Palatinate, Germany. The seat of the Verbandsgemeinde was in Otterbach. On 1 July 2014 it merged into the new Verbandsgemeinde Otterbach-Otterberg.

The Verbandsgemeinde Otterbach consisted of the following Ortsgemeinden ("local municipalities"):

 Frankelbach
 Hirschhorn
 Katzweiler
 Mehlbach
 Olsbrücken
 Otterbach
 Sulzbachtal

Former Verbandsgemeinden in Rhineland-Palatinate